Matt Anger (born June 20, 1963) is an American former professional tennis player. He is now the head men's tennis coach at the University of Washington.

Professional tennis career
Anger grew up in Pleasanton, California, and played at Amador Valley High School. He went on to be named the national 16-and-under singles champion in 1979 and to win the 1981 junior Wimbledon boys' singles title, resulting in a No. 1 ranking in the world by Tennis Magazine. He played collegiate tennis at USC from 1982 to 1984. He was a three-time All-American in these three years and was a Pac-10 singles finalist in 2003. In the same year, he led the USC Trojans to a third-place NCAA finish. The next season, he won the Pac-10 doubles championship, was a Pac-10 singles semifinalist, and helped USC win the Pac-10 conference championship. After this season, he turned to professional tennis.

The right-handed Anger reached his highest singles ranking on the ATP Tour on February 24, 1986, when he became the world No. 23. He won one singles (Johannesburg in 1985) and two doubles titles (Tokyo outdoor in 1986 and Brisbane in 1987) during his career.

Retirement from the Tour
Anger retired from the tour in 1991 and is currently the men's tennis coach at the University of Washington.  He resides in Clyde Hill, Washington with his wife, Kristin, and children, Maddie and Ben.

Coaching career
Anger initially joined the coaching staff at the University of Southern California. He then moved to the University of Washington where he became the head coach in 1995. He is heading into his 24th season in 2018. He is the most successful coach in Washington history with 371 wins. His teams have missed the NCAA championships only twice and have had five runs to the NCAA round of 16 since 2001.

Anger and his team have had a winning record in 21 of 22 seasons. He was named Pac-10 Coach of the Year in 2005 when the team won its first-ever Pac-10 title. Six singles players have earned All-American honors under his coaching and 11 have earned year-end top-50 rankings. Additionally, player Alex Vlaški won the 2003 All-American Championships - the first title for a Husky since 1924 - under his coaching.

Anger was inducted into the USTA Northern California Tennis Hall of Fame in 2005 and the ITA Hall of Fame in 2014.

Junior Grand Slam finals

Singles: 1 (1 title)

ATP career finals

Singles: 2 (1 title, 1 runner-up)

Doubles: 2 (2 titles)

ATP Challenger and ITF Futures finals

Doubles: 2 (0–2)

Performance timelines

Singles

Doubles

References

External links
 
 
 Profile on UW Athletics

1963 births
Living people
American male tennis players
People from Clyde Hill, Washington
Sportspeople from Walnut Creek, California
Tennis people from California
USC Trojans men's tennis players
Washington Huskies men's tennis coaches
Wimbledon junior champions
Grand Slam (tennis) champions in boys' singles
People from Pleasanton, California
American tennis coaches